Vıjaker (also, Vijəker, Vazhaker, and Vyzhaker) is a village and municipality in the Lerik Rayon of Azerbaijan. It has a population of 284. The municipality consists of the villages of Vijaker and Qışlaq.

References 

Populated places in Lerik District